Peddaveedu is a village in Mattampally mandal of Suryapet district in Telangana, India. It is located 73 km from district headquarters, Suryapet.

Geography
It is in the  elevation (altitude).

Demographics
Peddaveedu is the most populated village in Mattampally mandal . It has population of 8084 of which  4069 are males while 4015 are females as per Population Census 2011. The literacy rate of village was 50.61% where Male literacy stands at 62.01%  while female literacy rate was  39.17%.

Politics
It falls under Huzurnagar Assembly constituency and the village is administrated by Sarpanch , who is elected representative of village.

References

Villages in Suryapet district